Stephen Benedict Hickey is a British diplomat who has served as the ambassador to Iraq since 2019.

Biography
Hickey is from Bromley, his father is Edward (Eddie) Hickey of England, UK.

He had a BA in Philosophy, Politics and Economics at the University of Oxford. He later worked as a diplomat in several Arab League countries including Egypt, Libya and Syria, in which he served as a deputy ambassador in the latter from 2010 to 2011, as he was evacuated during the Syrian civil war.

In September 2019, he became the British ambassador to Iraq. In July 2020, he received death threats from the Iraqi Harakat Hezbollah al-Nujaba, due to his comments that Iraq was being held back by "armed groups operating outside state control".

Personal life
He is married to Laura Madelaine Hickey and has three sons. He can speak fluent Arabic.

References

External links 

 Stephen Hickey at Twitter

Living people
People from Bromley
Ambassadors of the United Kingdom to Iraq
21st-century British diplomats
Year of birth missing (living people)
English people of Irish descent
Alumni of the University of Oxford